Abraham I may refer to:

Abraham of Kashkar, a legendary primate of the Church of the East, 159–171 CE
Abraham I of Jerusalem, the first Armenian Patriarch of Jerusalem, 638–669 CE
Abraham I of Jerusalem, Greek Orthodox Patriarch of Jerusalem, 1468

See also
 Ibrahim I (disambiguation)
 Abraham II (disambiguation)
 Abraham III (disambiguation)